United Poultry Concerns is a national non-profit animal rights organization in the United States that addresses the treatment of poultry, including chickens, ducks and turkeys, in food production, science, education, entertainment, and human companionship situations. The organization was founded in 1990 by the animal rights advocate and writer Karen Davis.

According to their website:

The article title and slogan "Turkeys are Friends, not Food" may afford a glimpse into the raison d'être for the organisation.

See also
 List of animal rights groups
 Veganism

References

External links
 

1990 establishments in the United States
Organizations established in 1990
501(c)(3) organizations
Animal rights organizations
Animal welfare organizations based in the United States
Poultry organizations